The Dearness Allowance (DA) is a calculation on inflation and allowance paid to government employees (including public sector unit employees as public sector unit employees are also government employees) and pensioners in India, Bangladesh and Pakistan.

Dearness Allowance is calculated as a percentage of an Indian citizen's basic salary to mitigate the impact of inflation on people. Indian citizens may receive a basic salary or pension that is then supplemented by a housing or a dearness allowance, or both. The guidelines that govern the Dearness Allowance vary according to where one lives. Dearness Allowance is a fully taxable allowance.
The two types of Dearness Allowance are: 
 Dearness Allowance given under terms of employment.
 Dearness Allowance not given under the terms of employment.

History
The Dearness Allowance was introduced following the second World War, and was then known as the "Dear Food Allowance". The "Old Textile Allowance" was also introduced in 1947, though this was revised and reintroduced in 1953 as the "Revised Textile Allowance".
Initially DA was given in response to demand of employees for wage revisio. Later it was linked to Consumer Price Index.
In the past various committees have been constituted to look into the issue of payment of D.A. to Central Government employees.
The III Central Pay Commission recommended payment of DA whenever the CPI rose by 8 points over the index of 200 (with base 1960 = 100). The extent of neutralisation granted with effect from 1-1-1973 ranged from 100% to 35%.
The IV Central Pay Commission recommended the grant of DA on a 'percentage system' of the basic pay (1986).It also recommended payment of DA twice a year; 1 January and 1 July.Each instalment of DA was to be calculated with reference to the percentage increase in the 12 monthly average of All India Consumer Price Index (base 1960). The extent of neutralisation now ranged from 100% to 65%.
The V Central Pay Commission looked into the issue of differential neutralisation and found it to be injustice to senior officers and recommended uniform neutralization of 100% to employees at all levels. The Commission had suggested that dearness allowance should be converted into dearness pay every time the cost of living rises by 50% over the base level.
The VI Central Pay Commission recommended revision of base year of the Consumer Price Index (CPI) as frequently as feasible.It also changed base year for DA calculation to 2001 (base year 2001=100)

Calculation sheet

Formula for calculating Dearness Allowance for Central government employees after 1.1.2006 is :

Dearness Allowance %= {(Average of  year 2001=100) for the past 12 months – 115.77)/115.77}*100

In October 2021, the government revised the Consumer Price Index-IW base year from 2001 to 2016. A linking factor of 2.88 was defined for converting the new series with the base 2016=100 to the previous series on base 2001=100. Based on this, the DA is currently calculated with the following formula

DA  = (A  – 261.4)*100/(261.4)  Where A = Avg of CPI-IW (base 2016=100) for the past 12 months x linking factor of 2.88

Formula for calculating Dearness Allowance for Central public sector employees after 1.1.2007 is :

Dearness Allowance %= {(Average of  year 2001=100) for the past 3 months - 126.33)/126.33}*100

Beginning 1 January 1996, the Dearness Allowance is granted to compensate for price increases to which the revised pay scales relate. This will be reviewed twice a year, on 1 January and 1 July.

The following table shows All India Consumer Price Index since 1.1.2006 with Base year 2001=100

The DA Rate for Industrial Workers (since 1.1.2007 with Base year 2001=100) for 3rd Quarter (Sep-Dec), 2015 has been declared as 107.9% and that of 4th Quarter (Jan-Mar), 2016 is 112.40%.

The Vth Pay Commission recommendations were implemented since 1.1.1996 and consequently DA rate wef 1.1.1996 became 0.	 
Further in 1994 Central Government merged 50% of the Dearness Allowance (DA) with the basic pay w.e.f. 01.04.2004 and the Dearness Allowance continued to be calculated with reference to the AICPI (IW) average as on 1 January 1996 of 306.33 without changing the index base consequent to the merger. Accordingly, Dearness Allowance (DA) as mentioned in table below were sanctioned from 01.07.2004 till 01.07.2007. 

DA rate as applicable after implementation of VIth Pay Commission recommendations wef from 1.1.2006 is shown in table below :-

DA rate as applicable after implementation of VIIth Pay Commission recommendations wef from 1.1.2016 is shown in table below :-

Print media workers

For print media workers the Government of India has notified a DA Formula in the Gazette No 2532(E) of Nov 11, 2011, as recommended by the Majithia Wage Board for Journalists and Non-Journalists. The said Gazette notified formula was subsequently upheld by the Supreme Court of India by its judgment made on Feb 7, 2014. The Hon. Supreme Court upheld the recommendations as 'revised and determined' by Hon Justice (retd) Majithia. While 115.76 is the Base and Divisor for Central Government staff, for employees coming under Majithia Wage Board 167 had been recommended as Base and Divisor. The said 167 is the 12-month average of July 1, 2009 to June 30, 2010.

The average for the current DA period January to December 2017 is 274, which is the 12-month average AICPI-IW of Jan 1, 2016 to December 31, 2016. The DA calculation for Jan 2017 to June 2017 is 274 minus 167 * Bas
ic Pay and the result divided by 167. Total points 107.

7th Pay Commission 
Dearness allowance rate applicable after implementation of 7th Pay Commission recommendations wef from 1.1.2016 as shown in above table.  Accordingly the Nodal Authority Department of Expenditure, Ministry of Finance, Govt of India has issued the Office Memorandum as shown below:-

Pensioners
Both pensioners and their families are granted DA and this continues following reemployment with the Central or State Government, a Government undertaking, an autonomous body or a local body; that is, DA is allowed in addition to a recipient's fixed pay or "time scale". In other cases of reemployment, access to DA is subject to the limit of emoluments last drawn.

DA is not allowed during a pensioner's time overseas if employment is undertaken. It remains accessible to overseas pensioners whilst the recipient is not employed.

From 1 October 1984 to date, pensioners are paid DA at a certain percentage of basic pension. The allowance is calculated on the original pension without commutation. From 1 July 1986 the percentage has been revised every six months based on the cost of living  to 80 DA may be allowance.

References 

DA Calculator for PSU employees
DA Calculator for CG employees

Time Interval for revision of dearness allowance

Confirm! DA/DR from July, 2019: 5% increase in 7th CPC DA @17% and 10% increase in 6th CPC DA @ 164%

External links 
Government of Tamil Nadu, Directorate of Pension - Dearness Allowance
Government of Tamil Nadu, Directorate of Pension - Dearness Allowance Rate Tables
Indian Banks Association - Dearness Allowance for Bank Employees Dearness allowance
5% DA Hike Order, July 2019 Dearness allowance

Employment compensation